Harriet Ruth Harman  (born 30 July 1950) is a British politician and solicitor who has served as Member of Parliament (MP) for  Camberwell and Peckham, formerly Peckham, since 1982. A member of the Labour Party, she has served in various Cabinet and Shadow Cabinet positions.

Born in London to a doctor and a barrister, Harman was privately educated at St Paul's Girls' School before going on to study politics at the University of York. After working for Brent Law Centre, she became a legal officer for the National Council for Civil Liberties, a role in which she was found in contempt of court following action pursued by Michael Havers, a former Attorney General. She successfully took a case, Harman v United Kingdom, to the European Court of Human Rights, which found Havers had breached her right to freedom of expression.

Harman was elected as MP for Peckham at a 1982 by-election. She was made a shadow social services minister in 1984 and a shadow health minister in 1987. Under John Smith, she served as Shadow Chief Secretary to the Treasury and, under Tony Blair, as Shadow Employment Secretary, Shadow Health Secretary and Shadow Social Security Secretary respectively. Following the 1997 general election victory, she was appointed Secretary of State for Social Security and the first ever Minister for Women, serving until 1998 when she left the Cabinet. In 2001, she was appointed Solicitor General for England and Wales, serving until 2005 when she became Minister of State for Constitutional Affairs. She ran in the 2007 deputy leadership election and defeated five other candidates, ultimately defeating Secretary of State for Health, Alan Johnson, by a narrow margin. Gordon Brown, who was elected as party leader, appointed her Leader of the House of Commons, Lord Privy Seal, Minister for Women and Equality and Chairman of the Labour Party.

Upon defeat at the 2010 general election, Brown resigned as party leader and Harman, as Deputy Leader of the Labour Party, became Acting Leader of the Labour Party and Leader of the Opposition until Ed Miliband was elected leader. She subsequently served as Shadow Deputy Prime Minister, combining the position with that of Shadow International Development Secretary from 2010 to 2011 and then Shadow Culture, Media and Sport Secretary from 2011 to 2015. In 2014, Harman expressed regret after it was revealed that the Paedophile Information Exchange had affiliated status within the NCCL while she had been legal officer. Following Labour's defeat at the 2015 general election, Miliband resigned as Leader of the Labour Party and Harman once again became Acting Leader and Leader of the Opposition. She announced that she would also resign as Deputy Leader, prompting a concurrent deputy leadership election. She remains in the House of Commons as a backbencher.

Early life and career
Harriet Ruth Harman was born at 108 Harley Street in London, and privately educated at St Paul's Girls' School. She is a daughter of John Bishop Harman, a Harley Street doctor, and his wife Anna , a barrister, who gave up practising when she had children and who was the Liberal Party candidate for Hertford in the 1964 general election. They both had non-conformist backgrounds – Harman's paternal grandfather Nathaniel Bishop Harman, an ophthalmic surgeon, was a prominent Unitarian and the Spicer family were well-known Congregationalists. Her paternal aunt was Elizabeth Pakenham, Countess of Longford (née Harman), the wife of former Labour minister Frank Pakenham, 7th Earl of Longford, and her cousins include the writers Lady Antonia Fraser, Lady Rachel Billington and Thomas Pakenham, Earl of Longford. Her great-grandfather was Arthur Chamberlain a industrialist. Harman is a great-great-niece of the Liberal statesman Joseph Chamberlain, and is a cousin once removed of former Prime Minister Neville Chamberlain and former Foreign Secretary Austen Chamberlain. She is also related to Liberal politician Richard Chamberlain, MP. Through her uncle Lord Pakenham she is related by marriage to former Prime Minister David Cameron, whom she faced as Leader of the Opposition. Her cousin Rachel Billington is also godmother to former Prime Minister Boris Johnson.

Harman gained a 2:1 BA in Politics from the University of York. During her time at York, she was a member of Goodricke College and was involved with student politics. After York, Harman went on to qualify as a solicitor and worked for Brent Law Centre in London. Between 1978 and 1982, she was employed as a legal officer for the National Council for Civil Liberties. In this capacity, and just before becoming MP for Peckham in a by-election in 1982, she represented a prisoner who was kept in solitary confinement against the Home Office. However, she was found in contempt of court for sharing documents she had read aloud in the courtroom with a journalist. The contempt of court action was pursued by Michael Havers, a former Attorney General for England and Wales. Harman was thus the subject of numerous parliamentary questions and debates before she became an MP, including at a PMQ in February 1982. Harman subsequently took the case to the European Court of Human Rights, successfully arguing Havers had breached her right to freedom of expression. The case is still considered a significant case in British public law.

Harman was later involved in a European Court of Human Rights case against MI5. During a 1984 television interview by Cathy Massiter, it was revealed personal files were held by MI5 on Harman and on the (by then former-) General Secretary of the NCCL, Patricia Hewitt. They successfully argued that there had been an infringement of their rights because MI5 was not a legally constituted and democratically accountable organisation, this being the minimum standard in democracy. The success of the case led to enactment of the Security Service Act 1989.

Opposition Member of Parliament
Harry Lamborn, the Labour MP for Peckham, died on 21 August 1982. In the subsequent by-election held on 28 October 1982, Harman was elected to succeed Lamborn with 11,349 votes (50.34%), a majority of 3,931 over Social Democratic candidate Dick Taverne, a former Labour MP for Lincoln. The Conservative Party candidate was John Redwood, who came third, and went on to be elected MP for Wokingham in 1987.

In 1984, Harman became a Shadow Social Services minister and served as a Shadow Health minister in 1987. Following the 1992 general election she entered the Shadow Cabinet as Shadow Chief Secretary to the Treasury (1992–1994) and later served as Shadow Employment Secretary (1994–1995), Shadow Health Secretary (1995–1996) and Shadow Social Security Secretary (1996–1997).

Labour in Government

Under Tony Blair
Following Labour's victory in the 1997 general election, she became Secretary of State for Social Security and the first ever Minister for Women. She was given the task of reforming the Welfare State. During this time, her more notable policies included introducing a minimum income guarantee and winter fuel payments for the elderly. It was later ruled that the fuel payments policy breached European sex discrimination laws in that men had to wait five years longer to receive them than women. The policy was amended so both sexes qualified at age 60. She also headed up New Labour's controversial cut to single parent benefit despite the majority of those affected being women. There was public outcry at this perceived attacked on the living standards of some of the poorest women and children. According to The Independent, a group of women protesters shouted "Labour scum" as the measure was approved in Parliament – albeit with a rebellion of 47 Labour MPs and the abstention of many others. Harman was sacked from the position in 1998. According to many in the media, this was the result of a series of public rows with junior minister Frank Field, though others also cited her decision to cut benefits to lone parents as a factor. Harman voted with the party on all but a few instances during its period in government.

Harman made a return to the front bench following the 2001 general election, with her appointment to the office of Solicitor General, thus becoming the first female Solicitor General. In accordance with convention, she was appointed as Queen's Counsel, although she had previously had no rights of audience in the higher courts, did not obtain them and never presented a case during her time as Solicitor General, or at all.

Following the 2005 general election, she became a Minister of State in the Department for Constitutional Affairs with responsibilities including constitutional reform, legal aid and court processes and she represented Lord Falconer in the House of Commons on the frontbench.

On 16 March 2006, Harman relinquished her ministerial responsibilities for electoral administration and reform of the House of Lords. She stated that this was to avoid any potential conflict of interest after her husband Jack Dromey, the Treasurer of the Labour Party, announced that he would be investigating a number of loans made to the Labour Party that had not been disclosed to party officers. She retained her other responsibilities.

Deputy Leadership election
Harman announced her intention to stand for Deputy Leadership of the Labour Party when John Prescott stood down. She commissioned an opinion poll which found that she would be the most electorally popular potential deputy leader, a point she used in her campaign.

While she supported the Iraq War, during the Deputy Leadership campaign, she said that she would not have done so had she known about the lack of concrete evidence of weapons of mass destruction.

Harman did not have the support of any major unions, and helped to fund her campaign by taking out a personal loan of £10,000 and a £40,000 extension to her mortgage. Harman failed to report some donations and loans on time, and was subject to an Electoral Commission inquiry for breaches of electoral law. The commission said that her "failure to report on time is a serious matter" though the case was not handed over to the police.

On 24 June 2007, in a close contest Harman was elected Deputy Leader. Alan Johnson had led in all but the first of the previous rounds, but when second-preference votes had been redistributed after the fourth round, Harman as elected with 50.43% of the vote to Johnson's 49.56%

Campaign donations

In November 2007, it emerged that property developer David Abrahams' secretary Janet Kidd had donated £5,000 to Harman's successful deputy leadership bid. After an investigation by The Mail on Sunday newspaper into other donations made by people associated with Abrahams, and Prime Minister Gordon Brown's assertion that all such monies would be returned, Harman issued a statement saying she accepted the donation on 4 July "in good faith," had registered the monies with the Electoral Commission and the Register of Members' Interests, and that she "was not aware of any funding arrangements... between David Abrahams and Janet Kidd".

Under Gordon Brown
Harman was known as a long-term supporter of Gordon Brown and is regarded as a personal friend. On 28 June 2007, after she became Deputy Leader of the Labour Party and Brown was appointed Prime Minister, Harman joined Brown's Cabinet as Leader of the House of Commons, Lord Privy Seal and Minister for Women and Equality, and was also Chairman of the Labour Party. Unlike the previous Deputy Leader, John Prescott, Harman was not made Deputy Prime Minister.

When Harman, as Leader of the House of Commons, stood in for Gordon Brown during Prime minister's questions on Wednesday 2 April 2008 (due to the Prime Minister attending a NATO summit in Romania), she became the first female Labour Minister to take Prime Minister's Questions. She subsequently repeated this during Brown's absences.

Harman attacked the Conservative Party at the Labour Party Conference 2007, referring to them as the "nasty party" and suggesting that there would be little competition at the next election.

On 1 April 2008 the Daily Mail reported that Harman had decided to wear a kevlar-reinforced stab vest while touring her Peckham constituency under police guard. On 2 April The Guardian relayed information from the Metropolitan Police that "the type of Met Vest she wore over her jacket protected her from knife attacks and bullets, and, for her at least, was optional". Harman compared the decision to wearing a hard hat while touring a building site, which led the BBC's John Humphrys to respond, during an interview for BBC Radio 4, "You wear a hard hat on a building site because... there is the danger that something might drop on your head. You don't need to wear a bullet-proof vest on the streets of London, do you!" Harman told the BBC that the neighbourhood police team she was with put on their stab vests and gave her one to wear as well.

In April 2008, Harman's blog was hacked and changed to state that she had joined the Conservative Party. Harman later admitted when questioned by Sky News that the incident was a result of her using "Harriet" and "Harman" as her username and password. The hacker was Conservative Kemi Badenoch, who was elected as MP for Saffron Walden in 2017. Badenoch confessed to the hacking in an April 2018 interview with Core Politics and later offered Harman an apology, which she accepted.

Use of statistics
During the late-2000s recession, and following a government report which suggested that women were twice as likely to lose their jobs as men and feared losing their jobs more than men, Harman stated: "We will not allow women to become the victims of this recession". However, some statistics contradicted her position, including the Office for National Statistics report on the issue which stated "the economic downturn in 2008 has impacted less on women in employment than men". According to the ONS, men were losing their jobs at twice the rate of women. The Government Equalities Office insisted the ONS figures did not render pointless its efforts to help women.

In June 2009, Sir Michael Scholar, head of the UK Statistics Authority, wrote to Harman to warn her that different headline figures used by the ONS and Government Equalities Office with regards to pay differentiation between men and women might undermine public trust in official statistics. The GEO's headline figure was 23%, which was based on median hourly earnings of all employees, not the 12.8%, based on median hourly earnings of full-time employees only, used by the ONS. Scholar wrote: "It is the Statistics Authority's view that use of the 23% on its own, without qualification, risks giving a misleading quantification of the gender pay gap".

Expenses

In January 2009, Harman proposed a rule change to exempt MPs' expenses from the Freedom of Information Act. Her parliamentary order aimed to remove "most expenditure information held by either House of Parliament from the scope of the Freedom of Information Act". It meant that, under the law, journalists and members of the public would no longer be entitled to learn details of their MP's expenses. Labour MPs were to be pressured to vote for this measure by use of a three line whip. Her proposal was withdrawn when the Conservative Party said they would vote against, and in light of an online campaign by mySociety. The failure of the motion led to the disclosure of expenses of British members of parliament.

In December 2010, it emerged that Harman was amongst 40 MPs who had secretly repaid wrongly claimed expenses between 2008 and 2010. In November 2010, Harman's parliamentary private secretary Ian Lavery had blocked a motion designed to allow the repayments to be made public.

Human Fertilisation and Embryology Act 2008 

Harman allegedly blocked a series of votes to liberalise Britain's abortion laws via the Human Fertilisation and Embryology Bill (now Act). The pro-choice amendments proposed by Diane Abbott MP, Katy Clark MP and John McDonnell MP included NC30 Amendment of the Abortion Act 1967: Application to Northern Ireland. It was reported that the Labour Government at the time asked MPs not to table these pro-choice amendments (and at least until Third Reading) and then allegedly used parliamentary mechanisms in order to prevent a vote accordingly.

Equality Bill

As part of a proposed Equality Bill, Harman announced a consultation on changing the existing discrimination laws, including options for reverse discrimination in employment. Under the proposals, employers would be legally allowed to discriminate in favour of a job candidate on the basis of their race or gender where the candidates were otherwise equally qualified. Employers would not be required to use these powers, but would be able to do so without the threat of legal action for discriminatory practices. The white paper also proposed measures to end age discrimination, promote transparency in organisations and introduce a new equality duty on the public sector.

It was argued by critics that these changes could face a challenge under Article 14 of the European Convention on Human Rights, which prohibits discrimination on the basis of sex, race, colour, language, religion and on several other criteria. Michael Millar, writing in The Spectator, was of the opinion that "the Equality Bill before parliament today gives employers the right to choose an ethnic minority candidate or female candidate over a white male, specifically because they are an ethnic minority or female."

Harman also commissioned a report on allowing political parties to draw up all-black shortlists designed to increase the number of black MPs in Westminster. A further report proposed extended the arrangement allowing all-women shortlists beyond 2015 which will fail to have any impact in the 2010 general election. These proposals are supported by members of the three major parties, though no others allow discrimination in their shortlists. Inside the Labour Party, Harman has said she does "not agree with all-male leaderships" because men "cannot be left to run things on their own"; and that, consequently, one of Labour's top two posts should always be held by a woman. She had also stated that the collapse of Lehman Brothers might have been averted had it been 'Lehman Sisters'. These comments caused accusations of sexism and "insidious bigotry".

Return to Opposition

Following the resignation of Gordon Brown as Prime Minister and Leader of the Labour Party on 11 May 2010, Harman automatically became the temporary leader of the party as well as the Leader of the Opposition, entitling her to the salary and government car that come with the role. Although she was informally described in the media as 'Acting' Leader, she was fully Leader by the terms of the party's constitution, albeit on a temporary basis, as was the case with Margaret Beckett in 1994.

Following Brown's resignation, she quickly announced that she would remain Deputy Leader rather than standing for election as Leader. Her only public explanation was the assertion that: "You can't run for leader at the same time as being deputy leader".

She nominated Diane Abbott, MP for Hackney North and Stoke Newington, to prevent the election from being all male. But she nonetheless asserted her intention to remain neutral throughout the contest and said, "This is a very crucial period and we have got five fantastic candidates. All of them would make excellent leaders of the party."

Following Ed Miliband's election as leader, she returned to her role as Deputy Leader, shadowing Nick Clegg as Deputy Prime Minister and with the title of Deputy Leader of the Opposition. When Miliband assigned portfolios on 8 October 2010, he appointed her Shadow Secretary of State for International Development. In 2010, Harman referred to Danny Alexander as a "ginger rodent" in a speech to the Labour Party conference. This was greeted with cheers and laughter from the conference, but the Liberal Democrats and the Scottish National Party described them as gingerism and "anti-Scottish". Harman apologised for the offence caused. In 2011, Harman was moved to become Shadow Secretary of State for Culture, Media and Sport. In 2014, she accused Nick Clegg of turning into a Tory during Prime Minister's Questions.

Paedophilia support allegations and age of consent scandal 
In March 2014, an article from the Daily Mail exposed that a 1979 letter from paedophile group supporter contained Ms Harman's initials. Harman denied allegations that she had supported the Paedophile Information Exchange (PIE) when the advocacy group was affiliated with Liberty, while she was the pressure group's Legal Officer from 1978 to 1982. Both the Daily Mail and The Daily Telegraph also claimed that Jack Dromey MP (her partner) and former Health Secretary Patricia Hewitt had offered support to apologists for the sexual abuse of children while they were working for NCCL. The Guardian also states that in an NCCL briefing note dated 1978, Harman urged amendments to a 1978 Child Protection Bill declaring that "images of children should only be considered pornographic if it could be proven the subject suffered", which Harman says was an argument intended to protect from "unintended consequences" such as parents being prosecuted for taking pictures of their children on the beach or in the bath.

Most of the controversy comes after the NCCL  passed motion 39 in support of PIE's rights. 

Motion 39 stated: 

In a television interview, Harman said she had "nothing to apologise for," stating: "I very much regret that this vile organisation, PIE, ever existed and that it ever had anything to do with NCCL, but it did not affect my work at NCCL." Harman stated that while she did support the equalisation of the age of consent for gay men she had never campaigned for the age of consent to go below the age of 16 and accused the Daily Mail of trying to make her "guilty by way of association". Ed Miliband backed Harman and stated that she had "huge decency and integrity".

2015 general election
In the 2015 general election, Harman lead the Woman to Woman campaign involved a pink battle bus visiting constituencies. Following the poor election result and Ed Miliband's resignation, Harman again became acting leader of the Labour Party and Leader of the Opposition after announcing she would stand down from the role once a leadership election had taken place. While interim leader, she made the decision for Labour to abstain, rather than oppose, the Welfare Reform and Work Bill 2015, leading to 48 Labour MPs defying the whip. Harman also made the decision that Labour would vote for having a European Union membership referendum, reversing Labour's pre-election opposition to an EU referendum. After standing down, she became Chair of the Joint Committee on Human Rights in October 2015.

As the holder of the record as longest-ever continuously serving female MP in the House of Commons, Harman was dubbed the "Mother of the House" by Prime Minister Theresa May on 13 June 2017.

On 10 September 2019, Harman announced that she would stand to be the next Speaker of the House of Commons following the announcement by the current Speaker John Bercow of his intention to resign on 31 October 2019. She withdrew from the vote after the second ballot, having the lowest votes of all of the surviving candidates.

In December 2021, Harman announced she would be stepping down as an MP at the next general election.

View on S&M

Harman supported an amendment to the Domestic Abuse Bill 2019 to implement the verdict of R v Brown. R v Brown revisited the conviction of the earlier Operation Spanner, in which five men were convicted of engaging in homosexual sadomasochistic practices with consensual partners. Operation Spanner occurred in the 1980s and had been since criticised for its attitudes towards homosexuality. R v Brown re-affirmed that adults cannot consent to actual bodily harm—in statute law. The changes would prevent use of the rough sex murder defence, believing men should be prosecuted for murder even if they did not intend to kill their partners.

Harman wrote to the Attorney General to complain about an unduly lenient sentence of a man whose partner died while engaging in erotic strangulation. The sentence had been reduced from seven years to four years eight months in light of the man's guilty plea and self-referral to the police.

In popular culture 
Harman was portrayed by Deborah Findlay in the 2015 Channel 4 television film Coalition.

Personal life
Harman married Jack Dromey in 1982 in Brent, after meeting him on the picket line of the Grunwick dispute in 1977; she was legal advisor to the Grunwick Strike Committee. They had three children: Harry (born February 1983), Joseph (born November 1984) and Amy (born January 1987), who has Harman's surname. Labour colleague Patricia Hewitt is godmother to one of her children. She sent Harry to the grant-maintained Roman Catholic London Oratory School and Joseph to the state selective St Olave's Grammar School, Orpington. Harman has owned a number of houses and properties, including her home in Herne Hill, south London and a house in Suffolk.

Harman is a committed feminist, having said, "I am in the Labour Party because I am a feminist. I am in the Labour Party because I believe in equality." In 2017, her book A Woman's Work was published. It is her personal examination of women's progressive politics over the last thirty years.

In late 1988, Harman was absent from the Commons for some time and on 26 December it was reported that she was suffering pneumonia brought on by psittacosis.

In 2012, Harman was awarded the Freedom of the Borough of Southwark.

Motoring convictions

Harman paid the fine several months late and avoided appearing at Ipswich magistrates court. Harman was again caught breaking the speed limit the following April, this time in a 30 mph zone, receiving a further 3 points on her driving licence.

In January 2010 Harman pleaded guilty to driving without due care and attention in relation to an incident on 3 July 2009 where she struck another vehicle whilst driving using a mobile phone, she admitted the offence in court. Harman was fined £350, ordered to pay £70 costs, a £15 victim surcharge and had three points added to her licence. Road safety organisation Brake criticised the leniency of the punishment and decision to drop the charge of driving whilst using a mobile phone. The judge defended the decision stating: "Ms Harman's guilty plea to driving without due care and attention included her admitting that she had been using a mobile phone at the time".

See also
 Shadow Cabinet of Ed Miliband
 Shadow Cabinet of Tony Blair
 Shadow Cabinet of John Smith
 Shadow Cabinet elections: 1992, 1993, 1994, 1995, and 1996

Notes

References

Publications
 Sex Discrimination in Schools: How to Fight it by Harriet Harman, 1978, Civil Liberties Trust 
 Justice Deserted: Subversion of the Jury by Harriet Harman and J. A. G. Griffith, 1979, Civil Liberties Trust 
 Violence Against Social Workers: The Implications for Practice by Dan Norris, foreword by Harriet Harman, Jessica Kingsley Publishers 
 The Family Way: A New Approach to Policy Making by Harriet Harman et al., 1990, Institute for Public Policy Research 
 The Century Gap: 20th Century Man/21st Century Woman by Harriet Harman, 1993, Vermilion 
 Winning for Women by Harriet Harman and Deborah Mattinson, 2000, Fabian Society 
 Women with Attitude by Susan Vinnicombe, John Bank, foreword by Harriet Harman, 2002, Routledge 
 A Woman's Work by Harriet Harman, 2017, Allen Lane

External links

 Harriet Harman Official constituency website
 Southwark Labour 

Video clips
Harman on Tory 'toff' campaign BBC News, 18 May 2008

1950 births
Living people
Alumni of the University of York
English feminists
English socialists
English socialist feminists
Female members of the Parliament of the United Kingdom for English constituencies
English King's Counsel
British Secretaries of State
Female members of the Cabinet of the United Kingdom
Labour Party (UK) MPs for English constituencies
Leaders of the Labour Party (UK)
Leaders of the House of Commons of the United Kingdom
Leaders of the Opposition (United Kingdom)
Members of the Privy Council of the United Kingdom
Ministers for Women and Equalities
National Council for Civil Liberties people
People educated at St Paul's Girls' School
People from Marylebone
Politics of the London Borough of Southwark
21st-century King's Counsel
Solicitors General for England and Wales
Transport and General Workers' Union-sponsored MPs
UK MPs 1979–1983
UK MPs 1983–1987
UK MPs 1987–1992
UK MPs 1992–1997
UK MPs 1997–2001
UK MPs 2001–2005
UK MPs 2005–2010
UK MPs 2010–2015
UK MPs 2015–2017
UK MPs 2017–2019
UK MPs 2019–present
English solicitors
20th-century British women politicians
21st-century British women politicians
English non-fiction writers
Women opposition leaders
Women Law Officers of the Crown in the United Kingdom
Women's ministers
Women deputy opposition leaders
Women's ministers of the United Kingdom
Harriet Harman
Spouses of British politicians